Chizan (also Romanized as Chīzān and Chizān; also known as Chazān, Chezān, and Jazān) is a village in Deh Chal Rural District, in the Central District of Khondab County, Markazi Province, Iran. At the 2006 census, its population was 803, in 184 families.

References 

Populated places in Khondab County